Harry Hugh "Chief" Simmons (October 12, 1914 - March 27, 1990) was an American football and college basketball coach.

He served as the head football coach at Pueblo Junior College in Pueblo, Colorado from 1952 to 1955. He also led Pueblo Junior College's men's basketball team from 1947 to 1962, and aided their transition to a two-year program, remaining the head coach at Colorado State University–Pueblo (then known as the University of Southern Colorado) until 1980.

His 1961 team won the NJCAA Men's Division I Basketball Championship.

References

1914 births
1990 deaths
Colorado Buffaloes men's basketball players
CSU Pueblo ThunderWolves football coaches
High school football coaches in Colorado
CSU Pueblo ThunderWolves men's basketball coaches